NADPH-NAD+ transhydrogenase may stand for
 NAD(P)+ transhydrogenase (Re/Si-specific)
 NAD(P)+ transhydrogenase (Si-specific)